Diphtherophoridae is a family of nematodes belonging to the order Triplonchida.

Genera:
 Diphtherophora de Man, 1880
 Longibulbophora Yeates, 1967
 Triplonchium Cobb, 1920
 Tylolaimophorus de Man, 1880

References

Nematodes